= Dravidian numerals =

Indian numeral system

Dravidian numerals are a numeral system that originated in ancient India and remained the usual way of writing numbers throughout Dravidian-speaking regions in South Asia. Numbers in this system are represented by combinations of letters from the various Indian scripts. In modern usage it has been replaced by Hindu-Arabic numeral systems.
